Richard Lee Khautin (28 January 1940  – 3 October 1993) was an American bridge player from Brooklyn.

His father, Isaac, was born Jacques Khautin in France to Russian-Jewish parents.

Bridge accomplishments

Wins

 North American Bridge Championships (1)
 Blue Ribbon Pairs (1) 1972

Runners-up

Notes

American contract bridge players
1940 births
1993 deaths
People from Brooklyn
American people of Russian-Jewish descent